Walid Soliman (born April 11, 1975) is a writer, essayist and translator, born in Tunis, Tunisia.

Biography
Walid Soliman followed his secondary studies in the "Sadikia" (the first modern secondary school in Tunisia, founded in 1875). After his university studies in English language and literature, he obtained a degree in translation from the Institut Supérieur des Langues (University of Tunis I).

Walid Soliman is considered as one of the most innovative and original figures in contemporary Tunisian literature. Thanks to his perfect mastery of several languages and his deep knowledge of the main sources of thought and literature, he has ensured for himself a prominent position in the Tunisian cultural milieu. His translations into Arabic of quality texts written by the most important figures of world literature (Jorge Luis Borges, Charles Baudelaire, Gabriel García Márquez, André Breton, Mario Vargas Llosa...) are considered as authoritative.

Besides his translations into Arabic, Walid Soliman has translated several Tunisian poets into French and English.  Currently, he is preparing an "Anthology of Tunisian Poetry" (in French).

Furthermore, Walid Soliman is ex-president of the ATPCC (Tunisian Association for the Promotion of Cinema Criticism), and he has many contributions in several magazines and newspapers in Tunisia and other countries (Al-Quds, Akhbar Al-Adab, Jeune Afrique, etc.).

He is currently editor-in-chief of the cultural online magazine Dedalus.

Publications
 Le Troubadour des Temps Modernes (2004)
 Les Griffes des Eaux (2005)
 Saat Einstein al-akhira (Einstein's Last Hour), short stories collection (2008)
 Eros in the Novel, translation (2009)
 The Journey of the Blind, translation, Poetica Collection, (2009)
 Kawabis mariah (Merry Nighmares), short stories collection (2016)

References 

1975 births
Living people
Writers from Tunis
Tunisian essayists